Rebecca Lee (born May 5, 1967) is an American novelist and professor.

She is the author of the novella The City Is a Rising Tide (2006) and the short story collection Bobcat and Other Stories (2013), which won the Believer Book Award. Lee earned a MFA at the University of Iowa Writers' Workshop in 1992. She is an associate professor at the University of North Carolina Wilmington.

She has been awarded the Danuta Gleed Literary Award in 2012, the National Magazine Award for her short story "Fialta" in 2001, the Bunting Fellowship at Harvard University 2001-2002l and in 1997, the Rona Jaffe Foundation Writers' Award and the Michener Fellowship at the Iowa Writers' Workshop in 1997.

Works
Bobcat and Other Stories (2013)
The City is a Rising Tide (2006)

References

Living people
1967 births
21st-century American novelists
American women novelists
21st-century American women writers
University of North Carolina at Wilmington faculty
Believer Book Award winners
American women academics